Willibald Monschein is a paralympic athlete from Austria competing mainly in category F11 shot and discus events.

Williald competed in both the shot and discus in both the 2000 and 2004 Summer Paralympics.  He won bronze medals in both events in 2000 and a silver in the shot put in 2004.

References

Paralympic athletes of Austria
Athletes (track and field) at the 2000 Summer Paralympics
Athletes (track and field) at the 2004 Summer Paralympics
Paralympic silver medalists for Austria
Paralympic bronze medalists for Austria
Living people
Medalists at the 2000 Summer Paralympics
Medalists at the 2004 Summer Paralympics
Year of birth missing (living people)
Paralympic medalists in athletics (track and field)
Austrian male discus throwers
Austrian male shot putters
20th-century Austrian people
21st-century Austrian people
Visually impaired discus throwers
Visually impaired shot putters
Paralympic discus throwers
Paralympic shot putters